KAKT (105.1 FM, "The Wolf") is a radio station broadcasting a country music format. Licensed to Phoenix, Oregon, United States, the station serves the Medford-Ashland area.  The station is currently owned by Stephens Media Group, through licensee SMG-Medford, LLC.

Syndicated programming includes After Midnite with Blair Garner hosted by Blair Garner from Premiere Radio Networks.

Translators
KAKT broadcasts on the following translators:

HD Radio
On April 15, 2019, KAKT launched a classic country format on its HD2 subchannel, branded as "95.1 The Wolf"; the branding refers to its carriage on translator K236CI (95.1 FM).

The HD3 subchannel and K258DB (99.5 FM) carry a news/talk format; this programming had been heard on KCMX (880 AM) prior to its shutdown in 2023, and continues to be branded "99.5 KCMX".

References

External links
Official Website

Country radio stations in the United States
Phoenix, Oregon
AKT
Radio stations established in 2006
2006 establishments in Oregon